The 30th British Academy Scotland Awards were held on 8 December 2020 online, honouring the best Scottish film and television productions of 2019. The nominations were announced by Edith Bowman on 21 October 2020.

Nominees

Outstanding Contribution to Television
Stanley Baxter

Outstanding Contribution to Craft
Phyllis Ironside

See also
73rd British Academy Film Awards
92nd Academy Awards
26th Screen Actors Guild Awards

References

External links
BAFTA Scotland Home page

2020
British Academy Scotland Awards
British Academy Scotland Awards
British Academy Scotland Awards
British Academy Scotland Awards
British Academy Scotland Awards
British Academy Scotland Awards
British Academy Scotland Awards